The state of Colorado is served by the following area codes:

 303/720/983, which serve Denver and Boulder
 719, which serves Colorado Springs and southeastern Colorado
 970, which serves northern and western Colorado

References

Area code list
 
Colorado
Area codes